Troubadour is the second studio album by Somali-Canadian hip hop artist K'naan, released February 24, 2009. The album features performances by Kirk Hammett, Chubb Rock, Chali 2na, Mos Def, Damian Marley, and Adam Levine. Production was completed by Track and Field, a team composed of R&B artists Gerald Eaton and Brian West.

The album contains songs produced by Bruno Mars, Philip Lawrence, and Ari Levine, before they became The Smeezingtons, ("Wavin Flag" and "Bang Bang") and also after ("Wavin' Flag" remixes).

Critical reception

K'naan's second album has received generally positive reviews, compiling an average score of 74 on Metacritic. Billboard described it as "socially alert and frequently brilliant". David Jeffries of Allmusic called Troubadour a "rewarding, often eye-opening spectacle", praising the selections for the guest artists and referring to K'naan as "ridiculously talented". The album was shortlisted for the 2009 Polaris Music Prize. About.com named Troubadour one of the best Rap Albums of 2009. Troubadour was also included in PopMatters' list of top 60 albums of 2009, at a respectable 43rd position. The album fetched K'naan three Juno Award nominations and he ultimately won Juno artist of the year. 'The Independent gave it a perfect 10 out of 10 rating.

Singles
 "ABCs" was released as the album's first single. It peaked at #75 on the Canadian Singles Chart.
 "Wavin' Flag" was released as the album's second single (first in UK). The single was later remixed and used for the 2010 FIFA World Cup. It is his most successful single to date. It charted within the Top 5 in the UK, Netherlands, Norway, Italy, Ireland, France, Canada, Scotland, Spain, as well as others.
 A new version of "Bang Bang" was released as the album's third and final single featuring Adam Levine of Maroon 5. It peaked at #33 on the UK R&B Chart.
 A remix of "Wavin' Flag (Celebration Mix)" featuring will.i.am & David Guetta was also used to promote the World Cup as well as his album; a music video was also made for the remix. The video also featured will.i.am and David Guetta.

Promo singles
 "Dreamer" was released as the album's first promotional single.
 "Somalia" was released as the album's second promotional single.
 "I Come Prepared" was released as the album's third promotional single.
 "If Rap Gets Jealous" was released as the album's fourth and final promotional single.

Licensed songs
"ABCs" is used in the video game Madden 09 by EA Sports and the 2009 film The Trotsky, while "Dreamer" is used in promotions for the NFL Draft on NFL.com, and was used by ESPN during the national broadcast of the UConn-Kentucky men's basketball game on December 9, 2009. "I Come Prepared" is used in the video game Fight Night Round 4, also by EA Sports. "Wavin' Flag" is used in the video game NBA 2K10, which is a 2K Sports video game. Coca-Cola has announced that a remixed version of "Wavin' Flag" will be the official anthem of the 2010 FIFA World Cup. This version also appears in Konami's PES 2010. "Take a Minute" is used in Dane Tudor's award-winning part of the ski movie Everyday is a Saturday by Poor Boyz Productions. "Bang Bang" was featured in the television series Grey's Anatomy and the 2010 feature film The Karate Kid.

Track listing

Bonus tracks

Sample credits
 "T.I.A." features a sample "Simmer Down" By The Wailers.
 "ABCs" contains a sample from "Kasalefkut Hulu" written by Mulatu Astatke.
 "Dreamer" contains a sample from "Tey Gedyeleshem" written by Alemayehu Eshete.
 "I Come Prepared" contains a sample from "Shellela" Getatchew Mekurya.
 "Somalia" contains a sample from "Yene Mastawesha" written by Tilahun Gessesse.
 "America" contains a sample from "Lantchi" written by Tilahun Gessesse.
 "15 Minutes Away" contains a sample from "Yene Felagote" by Tilahun Gessesse.

Chart positions
In the US, the album sold over 15,000 copies in its first week of release and debuted at #32 on the Billboard 200. The album has sold approximately 82,000 copies in the US as of August 2010.
Only the 'champion edition' was released in the United Kingdom on July 16, and charted on the UK R&B Chart at a peak of 22.

References 

2009 albums
K'naan albums
A&M Octone Records albums
Albums produced by the Smeezingtons